The list of ship launches in 1698 includes a chronological list of some ships launched in 1698.


References

1698
Ship launches